Afroscoparia is a genus of moths of the family Crambidae, the grass moths. It was established in 2003 to provide a new name for a Scoparia species, now Afroscoparia contemptalis. At the same time, A. australis was described.

Species
Afroscoparia australis Nuss, 2003
Afroscoparia contemptalis (Walker, 1866)
Afroscoparia malutiensis Maes, 2004

References

Scopariinae
Crambidae genera